Mangrovicoccus is a Gram-negative and halotolerant genus of bacteria from the family of Rhodobacteraceae with one known species (Mangrovicoccus ximenensis). Mangrovicoccus ximenensis has been isolated from sediments from a mangrove forest from the Xiamen Island in China.

References

Rhodobacteraceae
Bacteria genera
Monotypic bacteria genera